L'Écho du Sud is a French weekly newspaper founded in 1929 by Louis Cambrézy.

History

On 13 April 1929, Louis Cambrézy, a French settler, founded the newspaper L'Écho du Sud: organe des intérêts généraux du Sud de Madagascar, in Fianarantsoa. Its goal was initially to maintain an active newspaper following the disappearance the previous year of La Voix du Sud, another newspaper founded in Fianarantsoa by Jules Thibier.

Its head office is located on Avenue Clémenceau, in Fianarantsoa, and it is printed by the Imprimerie du Betsileo. It is distributed at a price of 0.40 francs.

The newspaper appears every Saturday and deals with general information in Madagascar.

It is thanks to this newspaper that Louis Cambrézy was awarded the Legion of Honour in 1935, by Louis Rollin, Minister of the Colonies.

Logo

Editorial stance

The newspaper is openly in favor of colonialism and the maintenance of France in Africa, its founder having himself taken part in the Second Madagascar expedition. From 1936, he sided with the Spanish Republicans who were victims of the Francoists. During the Second World War, the newspaper took a stand against Vichy France, which persecuted its founder Louis Cambrézy for his membership in Freemasonry.

References

External links

 L'Écho du Sud digital archives from 1929 to 1941 in Gallica, the digital library of the BnF

Newspapers published in Madagascar
1929 establishments in France
Centre-right newspapers
Conservative media in France
Weekly newspapers published in France
Newspapers established in 1929